Spindly growth, also known as leggy growth, is a term used when two plants compete for sunlight and nutrients in order to develop.

Causes
Spindly growth occurs when one plant receives a great amount of sunlight, while the other would develop as a deformed one, due to lack of sunlight and other natural resources needed for photosynthesis. Another reason includes the fact that the sprout has been left under an artificial light source for more than 12 to 16 hours (the recommended amount to keep the plant under), overwatering, and excessive addition of fertilizer.

Solutions
 Keep under light for at least 12 hours a day.
 Remove deceased plants to promote growth for newly planted ones.

References

 Why Vegetable Plants Are Spindly
 StackPath
Spindly Seedlings under Grow Lights? - Gardenerd
 The flower and vegetable plants that I start indoors get tall and spindly. Why? | Horticulture and Home Pest News
 Keep Calm and Prune Dead Wood

Plant development